Temnora leighi is a moth of the family Sphingidae. It is known from the Comoro Islands.

The forewing upperside is similar to Temnora fumosa fumosa, but the ground colour is pale grey, especially in the costal half of the wing. The pale grey triangular patch is diffused into a broad pale grey patch that runs obliquely from the costa to the outer margin. The forewing underside ground colour is grey and darker brownish-grey basally. The submarginal line is represented by a series of black vein dots. The hindwing underside ground colour is grey and the submarginal line is represented by a series of black vein dots on veins. The median band inconspicuous except for a strong black spot.

References

Temnora
Moths described in 1915
Moths of Madagascar
Moths of the Comoros